Edinburgh South is a constituency of the House of Commons of the UK Parliament created in 1885. The constituency has been held by Scottish Labour since 1987, being represented by Ian Murray since 2010. Murray was the only Labour MP in Scotland to retain his seat at the 2015 and 2019 general elections and this is one of only three seats never held by the Scottish National Party (SNP).

Prior to the 2005 general election, the constituency had the same boundaries as the Scottish Parliament constituency with the same name (now replaced by Edinburgh Southern).

Constituency profile
The constituency covers the southern suburbs around the Braid Hills including Morningside, Comiston, Liberton and Gilmerton. This is a generally wealthy seat with a significant student population.

History 
Summary of results
A candidate fielded by the Labour Party has won the seat since 1987. Prior to that the political division for Westminster purposes voted for the Conservative and Unionist candidate, ahead of all other candidates by single preference, at each Westminster election from and including 1918. Back then, the electorates' single-most preferred candidate in simple voting was that of the Liberal Party, except in 1900 when a Liberal Unionist was returned.  The 2015 result gave the seat the 23rd-smallest majority of Labour's 232 seats by percentage of majority. In the 2017 general election, Ian Murray received the highest voteshare of any Scottish candidate and was also one of only two constituencies in Scotland where the winning candidate received a majority of the votes cast (the other one being Berwickshire, Roxburgh and Selkirk).

Edinburgh South is one of three constituencies in Scotland to have never elected an MP from the Scottish National Party at any point in history, alongside Dumfriesshire, Clydesdale and Tweeddale; and Orkney and Shetland.

Recent opposition candidates' performance
At the 2015 general election three of the seven parties' candidates standing retained their deposits, their votes exceeding 5%. Those doing so and not winning were SNP – 33.8% of the vote, and Conservative – 17.5% of the vote. At this election, the SNP increased their share of the vote by over 26%, coming a close second to Murray.

The Liberal Democrat candidate of 2005 fell within 0.9% of a winning majority. The Liberal Democrats' swing nationally was -15.2% swing in 2015. The swing in this seat against the party was however -30.3% resulting in the loss of their deposit, a fate not sustained by either of the party's two formative parties in the seat since 1970.

Turnout
Turnout has ranged between 81.1% in 1950 and 57.7% in 2001.

2016 EU referendum 
In the 2016 referendum of membership of the European Union, the constituency voted Remain by 77.8%. This was the tenth highest support for Remain for a constituency.

Boundaries 

When created in 1885, the Westminster constituency was partly a replacement for the Edinburgh constituency. The Redistribution of Seats Act 1885 provided that the constituency was to consist of the Municipal Wards of St. George, St. Cuthbert, and Newington.

In 1918 the constituency consisted of the "Merchiston, Morningside, and Newington Municipal Wards of Edinburgh."

In 2005, prior to the general election, Edinburgh South was one of six covering the City of Edinburgh council area. Five were entirely within the city council area. One, Edinburgh East and Musselburgh, straddled the boundary with the East Lothian council area, to take in Musselburgh.

For the 2005 election, the constituency was enlarged to include areas from the former Edinburgh Pentlands constituency, and became one of five constituencies covering the city area, all entirely within that area.

In terms of wards used in elections to the City of Edinburgh Council 1999 to 2007, it includes the wards of Alnwickhill, Fairmilehead, Gilmerton, Kaimes, Marchmont, Merchiston, Moredun, Little France, Newington, North Morningside and the Grange, Sciennes, and South Morningside.

These wards were replaced with new wards in 2007, as a result of the Local Governance (Scotland) Act 2004. The constituency therefore contains almost no electoral wards in its entirety. Those within its boundaries are Southside/Newington, Morningside, Colinton/Fairmilehead, and Liberton/Gilmerton, plus a handful of streets from Fountainbridge/Craiglockhart ward.

Members of Parliament

Election results

Elections in the 2010s

Elections in the 2000s

Elections in the 1990s

Elections in the 1980s

Elections in the 1970s

:

Elections in the 1960s

Elections in the 1950s

Election in the 1940s

Elections in the 1930s

Elections in the 1920s

Elections in the 1910s

Elections in the 1900s

Elections in the 1890s

Elections in the 1880s

 Caused by Childers' appointment as Home Secretary.

 Caused by Harrison's death.

Referendum results

2016 European Union membership referendum

2014 Scottish independence referendum

See also 
 Politics of Edinburgh

Notes

References

Westminster Parliamentary constituencies in Scotland
South
Constituencies of the Parliament of the United Kingdom established in 1885